A Zeldovich spontaneous wave, also referred to as Zeldovich gradient mechanism, is a reaction wave that propagates spontaneously in a reacting medium with a nonuniform initial temperature distribution when there is no interaction between different fluid elements. The concept was put forward by Yakov Zeldovich in 1980, based on his earlier work with his coworkers. The spontaneous wave is different from the other two conventional combustion waves, namely the subsonic deflagrations and supersonic detonations. The wave, although strictly speaking unrealistic because gasdynamic effects are neglected, is often cited to explain the yet-unsolved problem of deflagration to detonation transition (DDT).

The mechanism behind the spontaneous wave is readily explained by considering a reaction medium at rest with a nonuniform temperature distribution such that the spatial temperature gradients are small or at least it is not sufficiently large (large temperature gradients will evidently lead to interactions between adjacent fluid elements via heat conduction). Corresponding to each fluid element with a definite temperature value, there is an adiabatic induction period, the time it takes to undergo thermal explosion in the absence of any heat loss mechanism. Thus, each fluid element will undergo thermal explosion at a definite time as if it is isolated from the rest of the gas. A sequence of these successive self-ignitions can be identified as some sort of a reaction front and tracked. The spontaneous wave is influenced by the initial condition and is independent of thermal conductivity and the speed of sound.

Description of the spontaneous reaction wave
Let  be the initial temperature distribution, which is non trivial, indicating that chemical reactions at different points in space proceed at different rates. To this distribution, we can associate a function , where  is the adiabatic induction period. Now, define in space some surface ; suppose if , then this surface for some constant will be parallel to -plane. Examine the change of position of this surface with the passage of time according to

From this, we can easily extract the direction and the propagation speed of the spontaneous front.

Note that adiabatic thermal runaways at different places are not casually connected events and therefore  can assume, in principle, any positive value. By comparing  with other relevant speeds such as, the deflagration speed, the sound speed,  and the speed of the Chapman–Jouguet detonation wave, we can identify different regimes:

When , the spontaneous wave is not possible. Suppose a rapid reaction for a fluid element at some time . The spontaneous wave reaches the adjacent element located  distance apart from the first one at a time . However, before this wave arrives, heat conduction via the deflagration wave would have arrived and already initiated the chemical reaction. Thus, heat conduction is not negligible for this case and therefore spontaneous wave is not possible.  
Consider now the case . The spontaneous wave propagates sufficiently faster so that heat conduction is negligible. Moreover, since , the gas medium has sufficient time to equalize the pressure in that gas motion that arises are always subsonic. The inverse effect of the gas motion on the adiabatic induction period is negligible. Mathematically, this regime is identical to the KPP regime.
Next let us consider the case . The gas pressure does not have enough time to equalize and thus a shock wave forms which after some transient evolution, transitions to a detonation wave. This regime is identified as the Zeldovich's gradient mechanism that explains the DDT.
Finally, consider . This regime is similar to the weak detonation wave (such waves are not observed experimentally in combustion systems, although in principle, it is allowed) in which the pressure behind the wave is smaller than it would be in the Chapman–Jouguet wave.

References

Combustion